Michael Marquart (also known as Mike Marquart) is a Grammy Nominated American music producer, drummer, and guitarist. Marquart was a drummer in the rock band A Flock of Seagulls, active during the 1980s. In the mid 2000s, Marquart founded the rock band A Bad Think. In the 2010s, Marquart founded Windmark Recording, a recording studio based in Santa Monica, with his daughter Samantha Marquart. Marquart's Windmark Recording Studio has recorded many notable musical artists, including Coldplay, Jeezy, J. Cole, YG, Justin Timberlake, Pharrell, Kanye West, and Kendrick Lamar. ] In 2021, Marquart sold Windmark Recording to Joie Manda.

As a record producer, Marquart has worked closely with many well-known musicians and producers, including Teddy Riley and The Neptunes (an R&B duo consisting of Chad Hugo and Pharrell Williams). His albums have featured many notable musicians, including Jeremy Stacey, Victor Indrizzo, Fernando Perdomo,  Paul Bryan, Greg Leisz, Durga McBroom, and John Philip Shenale.

Early life
Marquart grew up in the town of Fort Atkinson, Wisconsin and first rock band was Wonderhorse where he played drums. As a self-taught guitarist, he played in bars during his adolescent years. In 1989, he temporarily played drums for the new wave band A Flock of Seagulls, and in 1990 recorded four songs with Alias as a drummer before moving to Virginia Beach, Virginia. Shortly thereafter, Michael married Winnie Johnson-Marquart and had a son. Marquart also has a daughter named Samantha, who he co-founded Windmark Recording's Santa Monica location with in 2015. Marquart currently spends half his time living and working in Los Angeles, California, and the other half in Virginia Beach, Virginia.

Career
Marquart initially started Windmark Recording in Virginia Beach, which served as an important recording space for The Neptunes during the late 1990s and early 2000s. Marquart restarted Windmark Recording in Santa Monica in 2015 with his daughter, Samantha Marquart, where he served as President until Windmark Recording was acquired by Joie Manda in 2021. In addition to Windmark, he also has a home studio called The Barn in Malibu, California; the studio was constructed using wood salvaged from the old Hollywood Bowl, originally constructed in the 1920s and went on to win an Outstanding Creative Achievement – Studio Design Project award at the 33rd NAMM TEC Awards.

In the mid 2000s, Marquart founded the underground electronic rock band A Bad Think releasing a debut Album, A Bad Think, in 2006 which went on to get nominated for Best Rock Album of the Year at the Hollywood Music Awards. Marquart released his second album, Simple Rhymes, in 2009 followed by his third album, Sara Lee, in 2010, fourth album, Medicine, in 2012, fifth album, Sleep, in 2014, and sixth studio album, Don't Forget Us, in 2015.

As his seventh studio album in 2016, Marquart produced the modern alternative rock album The Tragic End of a Dreamer, which blends diverse musical genres ranging from ambient to Southern rock, folk, and New Age music. The album features Paul Bryan (bass), Greg Leisz (pedal steel guitar), Durga McBroom (singer), and John Philip Shenale (composer).

Released in April 2019, Marquart's eighth studio album is titled The Savior, which includes the single "Feel Me." In November 2019, the album received a Grammy nomination for Best Immersive Audio Album.

Marquart's ninth studio album, Lifelike, was released April 2021 and is accompanied by a 20-minute documentary, Lifelike: The Making of An Album in Dolby Atmos.

Marquart's tenth studio album, X, was announced for release in 2022 upon the release of the single, Maybe Someday, in June 2022.

Discography
Albums produced by Michael Marquart include:

X (2022)
Lifelike (2021)
The Savior (2019)
The Tragic End of a Dreamer (2016)
Don't Forget Us (2015)
Sleep (2014)
Medicine (2012)
Sara Lee (2010)
Simple Rhymes (2009)
A Bad Think (2006)
Screwtop Wine (1995)
Familiar Dreams Panic'' (1991)

See also
A Flock of Seagulls discography
Winnie Johnson-Marquart

References

External links

Michael Marquart Interview NAMM Oral History Library (2021)

A Flock of Seagulls members
American rock guitarists
American singer-songwriters
Living people
Record producers from Wisconsin
Year of birth missing (living people)